Wassiou Okalawom Oladipupo (born 17 December 1983 in Abomey) is a retired Beninese footballer who last played for Feni SC.

Career
He has played for JS Kabylie in the Algerian Championnat National.

Clubs
 2002–2003: JS Pobé
 2003–2005: Olympic Zaouia
 2005–2008: JS Kabylie
 2009–2012: Soleil FC
 2012–2014: Feni Soccer Club

International career
Oladipupo has made several appearances for the Benin national football team. He was part of the Beninese 2004 African Nations Cup team, who finished bottom of their group in the first round of competition, thus failing to secure qualification for the quarter-finals. He was also a member of the Beninese 2008 African Nations Cup team.

Honours
 Won the Algerian League twice with JS Kabylie in 2006 and 2008
 Won the Libyan Premier League once with Olympic Zaouia in 2004

References

External links

1983 births
Living people
People from Abomey
Beninese footballers
Benin international footballers
2004 African Cup of Nations players
2008 Africa Cup of Nations players
Association football midfielders
JS Kabylie players
Olympic Azzaweya SC players
Soleil FC players
Beninese expatriate footballers
Expatriate footballers in Algeria
Beninese expatriate sportspeople in Algeria
Expatriate footballers in Libya
Beninese expatriate sportspeople in Libya
Expatriate footballers in Bangladesh
Beninese expatriate sportspeople in Bangladesh
Yoruba sportspeople
Feni SC players
Libyan Premier League players